Helpless may refer to:

Theatre, film and TV
Helpless (play), a play by Dusty Hughes
Helpless, a 1996 film by Shinji Aoyama
Helpless (2012 film), a 2012 film
"Helpless" (Buffy the Vampire Slayer), an episode of Buffy the Vampire Slayer
"Helpless" (Life on Mars), an episode of Life on Mars

Songs
"Helpless" (Crosby, Stills, Nash & Young song), a song by Neil Young
"Helpless" (Hamilton song), from the 2015 musical Hamilton
"Helpless", a song by Backstreet Boys from the album This Is Us
"Helpless", a song by Diamond Head from the album Lightning to the Nations
"Helpless", a song by Electric Light Orchestra from the album Flashback
"Helpless", a song by Gucci Mane from Droptopwop
"Helpless", a song by Jesse & Joy from Echoes of Love
"Helpless", a song by John Mayer from The Search for Everything: Wave Two
"Helpless", a song by Sugar from Copper Blue
"Helpless (You Took My Love)", a song by The Flirts
"Helpless", a song by Faith No More from Album of the Year
"Helpless", a song by Kim Weston
"Helpless", a song by The Platters

See also